Elephant tree is a common name for several plants with swollen stems and may refer to:

 Boswellia papyrifera, a species in the family Burserceae native to northeastern Africa
 Bursera microphylla, a species in the family Burserceae native to the southwestern United States and northern Mexico
 Operculicarya decaryi, a species in the family Anacardiaceae native to Madagascar, and cultivated for bonsai
 Pachycormus discolor, a species in the family Anacardiaceae native to Baja California